Mary Pinkett (née Glover) (September 8, 1926 - December 4, 2003) served in the New York City Council from 1974 to 2001, representing the 28th and 35th districts. She was the first black New York City Councilwoman.

Early life and career
Pinkett grew up in Crown Heights with her sister Loretta. As a young adult, Pinkett attended night classes Brooklyn College in order to receive her Bachelor's degree and later moved to Clinton Hill. She worked for the New York City Health and Hospitals Corporation before become involved in organized labor. Pinkett would eventually become President of Social Services Employees Union, Local 371 and Vice President of District Council 37.

New York City Council 
After attending the 1972 Democratic National Convention in Miami, Florida, Pinkett ran for New York City Council's newly created 28th District in 1973 and won. She was the first black woman to be elected to the City Council. She would go on to serve in the City Council for 28 years, representing the 28th district for 18 years and the 35th district for 10 years. Due to a new term limit law, Pinkett was unable to run for re-election in 2001 and retired. Her successor, whom she endorsed, was James E. Davis. Davis would later be shot and killed in New York City Hall during his first term.

Pinkett's accomplishments as a councilwoman include leading the passage of a whistleblower law to protect city employees. She was also a strong labor advocate within the City Council, notably obtaining the right for retired city employees to Medicare Part B  Pinkett also aided in the development of her Brooklyn district, including in the revitalization of Atlantic Village Housing. She served on many committees throughout her tenure, most notably as chair of the Civil Service and Labor Committee, the Committee on Aging, and the Committee of Governmental Operations.

Death and legacy
On December 4, 2003, Pinkett died due to heart failure brought on by cancer, according to her nephew Derek Glover. Her death was mourned by many New Yorkers, including Mayor Michael Bloomberg

Mary Pinkett Lecture Hall in CUNY Medgar Evers College's Student Support Services Building is named after Pinkett. She was a strong supporter of City University of New York.

In 2013, Washington Avenue in Brooklyn between Eastern Parkway and Lincoln Road was named Mary Pinkett Avenue in her honor by New York City Councilman Mathieu Eugene.

Electoral history

References

African-American New York City Council members
African-American women in politics
Politicians from Brooklyn
New York (state) Democrats
New York City Council members
2003 deaths
1926 births
Women New York City Council members
People from Crown Heights, Brooklyn
People from Clinton Hill, Brooklyn
Brooklyn College alumni
20th-century African-American women
20th-century African-American people
21st-century African-American people
21st-century African-American women